The Biysk constituency (No.41) is a Russian legislative constituency covering the entirety of Altai Krai. Previously the constituency was centred on the city of Biysk and covered eastern Altai Krai, however, in 2016 the constituency was pushed to the north to take part of Barnaul.

Members elected

Election results

1993

|-
! colspan=2 style="background-color:#E9E9E9;text-align:left;vertical-align:top;" |Candidate
! style="background-color:#E9E9E9;text-align:left;vertical-align:top;" |Party
! style="background-color:#E9E9E9;text-align:right;" |Votes
! style="background-color:#E9E9E9;text-align:right;" |%
|-
|style="background-color:"|
|align=left|Pavel Yefremov
|align=left|Independent
|
|37.21%
|-
| colspan="5" style="background-color:#E9E9E9;"|
|- style="font-weight:bold"
| colspan="3" style="text-align:left;" | Total
| 
| 100%
|-
| colspan="5" style="background-color:#E9E9E9;"|
|- style="font-weight:bold"
| colspan="4" |Source:
|
|}

1995

|-
! colspan=2 style="background-color:#E9E9E9;text-align:left;vertical-align:top;" |Candidate
! style="background-color:#E9E9E9;text-align:left;vertical-align:top;" |Party
! style="background-color:#E9E9E9;text-align:right;" |Votes
! style="background-color:#E9E9E9;text-align:right;" |%
|-
|style="background-color:"|
|align=left|Zoya Vorontsova
|align=left|Communist Party
|
|36.13%
|-
|style="background-color:"|
|align=left|Nikolay Shabanov
|align=left|Independent
|
|12.07%
|-
|style="background-color:"|
|align=left|Valery Pyakin
|align=left|Liberal Democratic Party
|
|8.08%
|-
|style="background-color:"|
|align=left|Valery Ostanin
|align=left|Yabloko
|
|7.36%
|-
|style="background-color:"|
|align=left|Valery Oleshevich
|align=left|Independent
|
|6.61%
|-
|style="background-color:"|
|align=left|Yury Zhiltsov
|align=left|Our Home – Russia
|
|6.42%
|-
|style="background-color:"|
|align=left|Mikhail Berulava
|align=left|Independent
|
|4.46%
|-
|style="background-color:#3A46CE"|
|align=left|Vitaly Kiryanov
|align=left|Democratic Choice of Russia – United Democrats
|
|4.22%
|-
|style="background-color:"|
|align=left|Leonid Korniyetsky
|align=left|Independent
|
|2.62%
|-
|style="background-color:"|
|align=left|Vadim Bobryshev
|align=left|League of Independent Scientists
|
|1.82%
|-
|style="background-color:#3C3E42"|
|align=left|Vera Nasyrova
|align=left|Duma-96
|
|1.06%
|-
|style="background-color:#000000"|
|colspan=2 |against all
|
|7.22%
|-
| colspan="5" style="background-color:#E9E9E9;"|
|- style="font-weight:bold"
| colspan="3" style="text-align:left;" | Total
| 
| 100%
|-
| colspan="5" style="background-color:#E9E9E9;"|
|- style="font-weight:bold"
| colspan="4" |Source:
|
|}

1999

|-
! colspan=2 style="background-color:#E9E9E9;text-align:left;vertical-align:top;" |Candidate
! style="background-color:#E9E9E9;text-align:left;vertical-align:top;" |Party
! style="background-color:#E9E9E9;text-align:right;" |Votes
! style="background-color:#E9E9E9;text-align:right;" |%
|-
|style="background-color:"|
|align=left|Zoya Vorontsova (incumbent)
|align=left|Communist Party
|
|31.05%
|-
|style="background-color:"|
|align=left|Valery Ostanin
|align=left|Yabloko
|
|15.55%
|-
|style="background-color:"|
|align=left|Stanislav Odintsov
|align=left|Independent
|
|12.88%
|-
|style="background-color:"|
|align=left|Yury Bogdanov
|align=left|Independent
|
|12.09%
|-
|style="background-color:"|
|align=left|Leonid Podanev
|align=left|Independent
|
|4.83%
|-
|style="background-color:"|
|align=left|Aleksandr Pankratov-Chyorny
|align=left|Independent
|
|4.70%
|-
|style="background-color:"|
|align=left|Andrey Mayevich
|align=left|Independent
|
|4.49%
|-
|style="background-color:"|
|align=left|Vladimir Rayfikesht
|align=left|Independent
|
|3.66%
|-
|style="background-color:"|
|align=left|Vyacheslav Guryev
|align=left|Liberal Democratic Party
|
|2.08%
|-
|style="background-color:#00542A"|
|align=left|Viktor Chumakov
|align=left|Russian Party
|
|0.81%
|-
|style="background-color:#000000"|
|colspan=2 |against all
|
|6.22%
|-
| colspan="5" style="background-color:#E9E9E9;"|
|- style="font-weight:bold"
| colspan="3" style="text-align:left;" | Total
| 
| 100%
|-
| colspan="5" style="background-color:#E9E9E9;"|
|- style="font-weight:bold"
| colspan="4" |Source:
|
|}

2003

|-
! colspan=2 style="background-color:#E9E9E9;text-align:left;vertical-align:top;" |Candidate
! style="background-color:#E9E9E9;text-align:left;vertical-align:top;" |Party
! style="background-color:#E9E9E9;text-align:right;" |Votes
! style="background-color:#E9E9E9;text-align:right;" |%
|-
|style="background-color:"|
|align=left|Lev Korshunov
|align=left|Independent
|
|33.27%
|-
|style="background-color:"|
|align=left|Zoya Vorontsova (incumbent)
|align=left|Communist Party
|
|21.08%
|-
|style="background-color:"|
|align=left|Sergey Khachaturyan
|align=left|Rodina
|
|14.80%
|-
|style="background-color:"|
|align=left|Valery Ostanin
|align=left|Yabloko
|
|9.91%
|-
|style="background-color:"|
|align=left|Vyacheslav Guryev
|align=left|Liberal Democratic Party
|
|3.52%
|-
|style="background-color:"|
|align=left|Iraida Parshutkina
|align=left|Independent
|
|2.52%
|-
|style="background-color:#7C73CC"|
|align=left|Yevgeny Skomorokhov
|align=left|Great Russia–Eurasian Union
|
|1.84%
|-
|style="background-color:#164C8C"|
|align=left|Lyudmila Golubeva
|align=left|United Russian Party Rus'
|
|1.34%
|-
|style="background-color:"|
|align=left|Sergey Tatlybayev
|align=left|Independent
|
|0.72%
|-
|style="background-color:"|
|align=left|Valery Safonov
|align=left|Social Democratic Party
|
|0.63%
|-
|style="background-color:#000000"|
|colspan=2 |against all
|
|8.94%
|-
| colspan="5" style="background-color:#E9E9E9;"|
|- style="font-weight:bold"
| colspan="3" style="text-align:left;" | Total
| 
| 100%
|-
| colspan="5" style="background-color:#E9E9E9;"|
|- style="font-weight:bold"
| colspan="4" |Source:
|
|}

2016

|-
! colspan=2 style="background-color:#E9E9E9;text-align:left;vertical-align:top;" |Candidate
! style="background-color:#E9E9E9;text-align:leftt;vertical-align:top;" |Party
! style="background-color:#E9E9E9;text-align:right;" |Votes
! style="background-color:#E9E9E9;text-align:right;" |%
|-
|style="background-color:"|
|align=left|Aleksandr Prokopyev
|align=left|United Russia
|
|36.55%
|-
|style="background-color:"|
|align=left|Maria Prusakova
|align=left|Communist Party
|
|14.27%
|-
|style="background:"| 
|align=left|Marina Osipova
|align=left|A Just Russia
|
|14.22%
|-
|style="background-color:"|
|align=left|Pavel Rego
|align=left|Liberal Democratic Party
|
|13.99%
|-
|style="background:"| 
|align=left|Tatyana Astafyeva
|align=left|Communists of Russia
|
|7.88%
|-
|style="background:"| 
|align=left|Konstantin Yemeshin
|align=left|Yabloko
|
|2.88%
|-
|style="background-color:"|
|align=left|Konstantin Mironenko
|align=left|The Greens
|
|2.24%
|-
|style="background:"| 
|align=left|Vladimir Mikhaylyuk
|align=left|Party of Growth
|
|1.89%
|-
|style="background:"| 
|align=left|Sergey Ubrayev
|align=left|Rodina
|
|1.36%
|-
| colspan="5" style="background-color:#E9E9E9;"|
|- style="font-weight:bold"
| colspan="3" style="text-align:left;" | Total
| 
| 100%
|-
| colspan="5" style="background-color:#E9E9E9;"|
|- style="font-weight:bold"
| colspan="4" |Source:
|
|}

2021

|-
! colspan=2 style="background-color:#E9E9E9;text-align:left;vertical-align:top;" |Candidate
! style="background-color:#E9E9E9;text-align:left;vertical-align:top;" |Party
! style="background-color:#E9E9E9;text-align:right;" |Votes
! style="background-color:#E9E9E9;text-align:right;" |%
|-
|style="background-color:"|
|align=left|Aleksandr Prokopyev (incumbent)
|align=left|United Russia
|
|31.41%
|-
|style="background-color:"|
|align=left|Anton Artsibashev
|align=left|Communist Party
|
|24.46%
|-
|style="background-color: " |
|align=left|Oleg Boronin
|align=left|A Just Russia — For Truth
|
|12.17%
|-
|style="background-color:"|
|align=left|Ksenia Kireyeva
|align=left|New People
|
|7.69%
|-
|style="background-color:"|
|align=left|Maksim Zheleznovsky
|align=left|Liberal Democratic Party
|
|7.30%
|-
|style="background-color:"|
|align=left|Ivan Makarov
|align=left|Party of Pensioners
|
|5.16%
|-
|style="background-color:"|
|align=left|Sergey Matasov
|align=left|Communists of Russia
|
|4.70%
|-
|style="background-color:"|
|align=left|Yury Ilyinykh
|align=left|Yabloko
|
|2.18%
|-
| colspan="5" style="background-color:#E9E9E9;"|
|- style="font-weight:bold"
| colspan="3" style="text-align:left;" | Total
| 
| 100%
|-
| colspan="5" style="background-color:#E9E9E9;"|
|- style="font-weight:bold"
| colspan="4" |Source:
|
|}

Notes

References

Russian legislative constituencies
Politics of Altai Krai